= Sexpo 2005 =

2005 exhibition held in Singapore

Sexpo 2005 is Southeast Asia's first sex exhibition held from 18 November to 20 November in Singapore.

It was an exhibition event that showcased different aspects of health, lifestyle, culture and novelty. Among the cultural exhibits were miniature sculptures placed in dowry boxes to teach young couples how to consummate their marriage, an early form of Chinese sex education that dates from the Qing Dynasty (1644-1911).

The event also included seminars and forums by medical doctors, sexologist and other experts on sexual health problems and solutions. There were also sessions on sensual dancing and novelties, some of which were restricted to people above the age of 21 years. Other topics included infertility and treatments, and advice on how parents can discuss sex education with their children.

More than 43,000 visitors witnessed this inaugural event in Singapore.
